Espen Harald Bjerke (born 12 April 1980) is a Norwegian cross-country skier who represents Lillehammer SK.

He took part in his first junior World Championship in 1999 where he came 13th. He made his World Cup debut in 2001 with a 20th place. His best World Cup placing is (as of 2007)  a fourth place in 2005.

He had the record of highest VO2max (maximum amount of oxygen uptake) with 96.0 milliliter per kilogram per minute (7.3 liter/min, 76 kg body weight), set in 2005.

Cross-country skiing results
All results are sourced from the International Ski Federation (FIS).

World Championships

World Cup

Season standings

References

External links 
 
"Team Vraka" (Aftenposten, 2006)

1980 births
Living people
Norwegian male cross-country skiers